Cephalotes grandinosus is a species of arboreal ant of the genus Cephalotes, characterized by an odd shaped head and the ability to "parachute" by steering their fall if they drop from the tree they are on, giving their name also as gliding ants.

References

External links

grandinosus